Spiritual/Shouter Baptist Liberation Day is an annual public holiday celebrated in  Trinidad and Tobago on 30 March.  The holiday commemorates the repeal on 30 March 1951 of the 1917 Shouter Prohibition Ordinance that prohibited the activities of the Shouter or Spiritual Baptist faith.

Trinidad and Tobago is the only country in the world that celebrates a public holiday for the Spiritual Baptist faith.

It is a very important event for the Spiritual Baptists in Trinidad.

References

External links
Spiritual/Shouter Baptist Liberation Day from the NALIS website
St Francis National Evangelical Spiritual Baptist Faith Archdiocese of Canada
Interesting account of Spiritual Baptist beliefs and customs

Public holidays in Trinidad and Tobago
March observances

^-^